Kiamba National High School (KNHS) is one of the three public high schools in the municipality of Kiamba, Sarangani. It was founded in 1987 as an annex municipal high school of Colon Barangay High School in its nearby municipality of Maasim, Sarangani.

Student Clubs 

 Supreme Student Government
 School Publication
 English Club
 Science & TechnologyClub
 Mathematics Club
 Filipino Club
 MAPEH Club
 Araling Panlipunan Club
 TLE Club
ESWM Advocates Club

External links 
202.91.162.20/kiambaHS
www.facebook.com/pages/Kiamba-National-High-School/203496689677774

1987 establishments in the Philippines
Educational institutions established in 1987
High schools in the Philippines
Schools in Sarangani